Robert Remez is an American experimental psychologist and cognitive scientist, and is Professor of Psychology at Barnard College, Columbia University and Chair of the Columbia University Seminar on Language & Cognition (founded in 2000). His teaching focuses on the relationships between cognition, perception and language. He is best known for his theoretical and experimental work on perceptual organization and speech perception.

With Carol Fowler, Philip Rubin, and Michael Turvey, he introduced the consideration of speech in terms of a dynamical systems/action theory perspective. With Rubin and various other colleagues, he has used the technique of sinewave synthesis as a unique tool for exploring perceptual organization. He is the co-editor, with David Pisoni, of the Handbook of Speech Perception. He was the Ann Olin Whitney Professor and former Chair of the Department of Psychology at Barnard College and is a member of the Board of Directors of Haskins Laboratories.

Remez is a graduate of Brandeis University and the University of Connecticut.

Awards and honors
 Fellow, Acoustical Society of America
 Fellow, American Association for the Advancement of Science
 Fellow, American Psychological Association
 Fellow, Association for Psychological Science

Selected publications

 Fowler, C. A., Rubin, P. E., Remez, R. E., & Turvey, M. T. (1980). Implications for speech production of a general theory of action. In B. Butterworth (Ed.), Language Production, Vol. I: Speech and Talk (pp. 373–420). New York: Academic Press.
 
 
 Remez, R. E. (1994). A guide to research on the perception of speech. In M. A. Gernsbacher (Ed.), Handbook of Psycholinguistics (pp. 145–172). New York: Academic Press.
 
 
 Remez, R. E. (2005). The perceptual organization of speech. In D. B. Pisoni and R. E. Remez (Eds.), The Handbook of Speech Perception, (pp. 28–50). Oxford: Blackwell

References

21st-century American psychologists
Brandeis University alumni
Haskins Laboratories scientists
Speech perception researchers
University of Connecticut alumni
Columbia University faculty
Living people
Fellows of the Acoustical Society of America
Fellows of the American Association for the Advancement of Science
Fellows of the American Psychological Association
Fellows of the Association for Psychological Science
Year of birth missing (living people)